is a Japanese professional baseball outfielder. He is currently a free agent. He previously played for the Chunichi Dragons in Japan's Nippon Professional Baseball.

External links

NPB.jp

1989 births
Living people
Japanese baseball players
Chunichi Dragons players
Baseball people from Chiba Prefecture
Asian Games medalists in baseball
Baseball players at the 2014 Asian Games
Medalists at the 2014 Asian Games
Asian Games bronze medalists for Japan